During the 2008–09 English football season, Scunthorpe United F.C. competed in League One, the third tier of English football. Scunthorpe also competed in the FA Cup, Football League Cup and Football League Trophy.

Season summary 

The 2008–09 season saw Scunthorpe reach Wembley twice. The Iron qualified for the Football League Trophy final, but were beaten 3–2 after extra time by Luton Town. The club then qualified for the League One play-offs through an 88th-minute equaliser by club captain Cliff Byrne against promotion rivals Tranmere Rovers on the last day of the regular season. Scunthorpe beat MK Dons on penalties after a 1–1 aggregate draw in the semi-finals, before beating Millwall in the Wembley final 3–2, with two goals from Matt Sparrow and one from Martyn Woolford, to achieve promotion back to the Championship at the first time of asking.

Squad

Competitions

Football League One

League table

Play-offs

FA Cup

Football League Cup

Football League Trophy

References

Scunthorpe United
Scunthorpe United F.C. seasons